Brunswick ( or ) is the largest city in Medina County, Ohio, United States approximately 20 mi (32 km) SW of Cleveland. The population was 34,255 at the 2010 census and estimated at 34,880 as of 2019. It is part of the Cleveland Metropolitan Area.

History
The unincorporated place called Brunswick was founded on January 1, 1815, and was named randomly in a naming contest. What would become the city of Brunswick was founded on January 1, 1960. It was incorporated as a village on February 1, 1960, and was incorporated as a city on October 2, 1960.

On June 23, 2014 a tornado hit Brunswick, and the tornado was rated a high-end EF1 or EF2.

Geography
Brunswick is located at  (41.244051, -81.828360).

Demographics

2010 census
At the 2010 census there were 34,255 people, 12,967 households, and 9,565 families living in the city. The racial makeup of the city was 95.5% White, 1.2% African American, 0.1% Native American, 1.2% Asian, 0.6% from other races, and 1.3% from two or more races. Hispanic or Latino of any race were 2.3%.

Of the 12,967 households 36.2% had children under the age of 18 living with them, 58.3% were married couples living together, 10.6% had a female householder with no husband present, 4.9% had a male householder with no wife present, and 26.2% were non-families. 21.9% of households were one person and 7.5% were one person aged 65 or older. The average household size was 2.63 and the average family size was 3.07.

The median age was 39.1 years. 25.2% of residents were under the age of 18; 7.5% were between the ages of 18 and 24; 27% were from 25 to 44; 28.3% were from 45 to 64; and 11.9% were 65 or older. The gender makeup of the city was 49.1% male and 50.9% female.

2000 census
At the 2000 census there were 33,388 people, 11,883 households, and 9,280 families living in the city. The population density was 2,662.3 people per square mile (1,028.0/km). There were 12,251 housing units at an average density of 976.9/sq mi (377.2/km).  The racial makeup of the city was 97.09% White, 0.74% African American, 0.13% Native American, 0.86% Asian, 0.02% Pacific Islander, 0.38% from other races, and 0.78% from two or more races. Hispanic or Latino of any race were 1.36%.

Of the 11,883 households 39.3% had children under the age of 18 living with them, 65.3% were married couples living together, 9.3% had a female householder with no husband present, and 21.9% were non-families. 17.7% of households were one person and 5.2% were one person aged 65 or older. The average household size was 2.79 and the average family size was 3.18.

The age distribution was 27.7% under the age of 18, 8.1% from 18 to 24, 32.7% from 25 to 44, 23.2% from 45 to 64, and 8.2% 65 or older. The median age was 35 years. For every 100 females, there were 96.5 males. For every 100 females age 18 and over, there were 94.4 males.

The median household income was $56,288 and the median family income  was $62,080. Males had a median income of $42,675 versus $27,882 for females. The per capita income for the city was $21,937. About 3.2% of families and 4.6% of the population were below the poverty line, including 5.7% of those under age 18 and 5.0% of those age 65 or over.

Education
Public education in Brunswick is administered by Brunswick City School District, which operates seven elementary schools, one middle school Brunswick Middle School, and Brunswick High School.

Other schools in the city of Brunswick include St. Ambrose School, a Roman Catholic parochial school serving Kindergarten through 8th grade.

Brunswick has a public library, a branch of Medina County District.  Library.

Media
Brunswick is served by a daily newspaper, The Medina County Gazette which is published every day of the week except Sundays and a free weekly newspaper, The Brunswick Post which is published every Saturday. In addition, the Akron Beacon Journal and the Cleveland Plain Dealer occasionally cover the city and Medina County. Brunswick is served by numerous television and radio stations from both the Greater Cleveland, Greater Akron and Greater Canton areas.

Notable people
Dean Heil, former folkstyle wrestler, two-time NCAA wrestling champion at Oklahoma State
Pete Kostelnick, ultramarathon runner
Natalie Sideserf, Cake artist, star of Texas Cake House
Alissa Violet, YouTube personality and makeup artist
Ricky Wysocki, professional disc golfer

References

Cities in Ohio
Cities in Medina County, Ohio
Cleveland metropolitan area
1815 establishments in Ohio
Populated places established in 1815